Dalip Tahil (born as Dalip Tahilramani; 30 October 1952) is an Indian film, television and theatre actor. He studied at Sherwood College in Nainital, India. After attending Aligarh Muslim University for a year, he graduated from St. Xavier's College, Mumbai. Tahil is best known for his work in Baazigar (1993), Raja (1995), Hum hai rahi pyar ke (1993) and Qayamat Se Qayamat Tak (1988).

Early life
Dalip Tahilramani was born on 30 October 1952 in Agra, Uttar Pradesh, India into a Sindhi Hindu family which had recently migrated from Sindh during the Partition of India.

Stage
Dalip Tahil began to appear on stage while at Sherwood College, Nainital, at the age of 10. Dalip's participation over the years in choir, elocution competitions, Nativity plays, and formal and informal concerts gave him a platform to be cast in principal parts. So, during his senior years at school, he won the Kendall Cup for the best actor in two consecutive years, first as Joseph in the play My Three Angels and again as Macbeth in Shakespeare's Macbeth. He was declared the best actor for a record third time in 1969, his final year at Sherwood College.

Dalip moved with his family to Mumbai in 1968, joined the Theatre Group Bombay and trained under its directors, Alyque and Pearl Padamsee. He appeared in some of its major productions, such as John the Baptist and Jesus in Godspell (India's first English theatre musical, directed by Pearl Padamsee), Stanley Kowalski in Tennessee Williams' A Street Car Named Desire, directed by Alyque Padamsee.

He played Galy Gay, in Amal Alana's production of Bertolt Brecht's Man Is a Man.

He is internationally known for starring as Madan Kumar in the A.R Rahman theatre musical Bombay Dreams, which he performed in over 500 shows through 2002, at the Apollo Theatre in London.

Films

Director Shyam Benegal noticed Dalip and offered him a part in his first feature film Ankur in 1974. In 1980, Ramesh Sippy offered him the role of a villain in his epic production, Shaan. This was followed by a cameo in Sir Richard Attenborough's,Gandhi, in 1982.

He went on to play principal character roles of a villain or supporting role of a father, police officer, in over 100 Bollywood films from the 1980s to 2013. He appeared in the Merchant Ivory English films The Deceivers and The Perfect Murder (1988).

In 1984, he acted as the father of Baby Sonia in India's first 3-D film, My Dear Kuttichathan, produced by Navodaya. In 2013, he portrayed Jawaharlal Nehru, in Rakeysh Om Prakash Mehra's, Bhaag Milkha Bhaag, with Farhan Akhtar in the title role of Milkha Singh. In 2007, he starred in the Punjabi movie, Sajna ve Sajna. He is well remembered for his villainous role of Madan Chopra, a wicked businessman in Baazigar (1993). Dalip has also played the role of Rupert Dali in Mission Mangal.

Television
On television, Tahil played roles in Sanjay Khan's television serial The Sword of Tipu Sultan and Ramesh Sippy's Buniyaad. Thereafter, Tahil worked in his first British television series, Bombay Blue (TV series).

Tahil gained national recognition across the UK when he won the role of Dan Ferreira, in the iconic BBC1 soap opera EastEnders in 2003, appearing in over 60 episodes. He made his last appearance in the episode aired on 30 December 2003. As a result of an insufficient work permit application, Dalip had to exit the series which compelled him to appeal to the Secretary of State in the UK. Dalip was subsequently granted indefinite leave to remain in the UK in 2005.

In 2007, Tahil appeared in the BBC2 mini-series Nuclear Secrets in the episode "Terror Traders", playing Pakistani scientist Abdul Qadeer Khan. He later played the role of King Dasaratha in the Indian television series, Siya Ke Ram, which premiered on 16 November 2015 through Star Plus and concluded on 4 November 2016.

Music
He released an album titled Raaz Ki Baaten.

Selected filmography

 Ankur (1974)
 Shaan (1980) as Kumar
 Shakti (1982) as Ganpat Rai
 Gandhi (1982) as Zia
 Arth (1982) as Dilip
 My Dear Kuttichathan (Malayalam) (1984) as Laxmi's father, [India's first 3D Film]
 Aaj Ki Awaz (1984) as Suresh Thakur
 Trikaal (1985) as Leon Gonsalves
 Adventures of Tarzan (1985) as D.K.
 Janbaaz (1986) as Farm Manager
 Sultanat (1986) as Janna
 Aakhree Raasta (1986) as Police Inspector / Police Commissioner Roop Kumar Sahay
 Buniyaad (1987) TV serial on DD National as "Bhushan" Haveli Ram's Eldest Son
 Jalwa (1987) as D.D.'s Henchman
 Nazrana as Banke 
 Dance Dance (1987) as Brijmohan "Binjo"
Kaash (1987) as Vijay
Mere Baad (1988) as Jeevan
 Qayamat Se Qayamat Tak (1988) as Dhanraj Singh
 The Deceivers (1988) as Daffadar Ganesha
 The Perfect Murder (1988) as Dilip Lal
 Ram Lakhan (1989) as Thakur Pratap Singh
 Tridev (1989) as Don
 Love Love Love (1989) as Amit's Father
 The Sword of Tipu Sultan (1989) on DD National
 Kishen Kanhaiya (1990) as Mahesh
 Ajooba (1991) as Shah Rukh
 Ganga Jamuna Ki Lalkar (1991)
 Saudagar (1991) as Gajendra Singh
 Vishwatma (1992) as DCP Gupta
 Deewana (1992) as Ramakant Sahay
 Jungle Queen (1993)
 King Uncle (1993) as Pradeep Malik
 Hum Hain Rahi Pyar Ke (1993) as Mr. Bijlani
 Darr (1993) as Captain Mehra
 Baazigar (1993) as Madan Chopra
 Professor Ki Padosan (1993) as Ranjeet
 Suhaag (1994) as Dr. Sinha
 Imtihan (1994) as Dindayal Khanna
 Aatank Hi Aatank (1995) as Robert
 Raja (1995) as Vishwa Garewal
 Jeet (1996) as Ramakant Sahay
 Judwaa (1997) as SP Malhorta
 Ishq (1997) as Harbanslal
 Gupt (1997) as Meghnath Choudhary
 Soldier (1998) as Veerendra Sinha
 Ghulam (1998) as Siddharth's Father
 Mann (1999) as Pratap Singhania
 Chal Mere Bhai (2000) as Balraj Oberoi
 Dhai Akshar Prem Ke (2000) as Rai Bahadur
 Kaho Naa Pyaar Hai (2000) as Mr. Malik
 Phir Bhi Dil Hai Hindustani (2000) as Mr. Chinoy
 Mujhe Kucch Kehna Hai (2001) as Karan's father
 Chhupa Rustam: A Musical Thriller (2001) as Diwan Baldev
 Chori Chori Chupke Chupke (2001) as Rajeev Malhotra
 Ajnabee (2001) as Priya's Father
 Love Ke Liye Kuchh Bhi Karega (2001) as Sapna's Father
 Maine Dil Tujhko Diya (2002) as Mr. Chopra
 Talaash (2003) as D.K. Sharma
 EastEnders (2003) as Dan Ferreira (British soap opera)
 Paarewari (2004) as Madhu's father (Sindhi language film)
 Nuclear Secrets (2007) as A.Q Khan
 Shakalaka Boom Boom (2007) as album producer
 Partner (2007) as Raja Singh
 Dhan Dhana Dhan Goal (2007) as Johny Bakshi
 Race (2008) as Kabir Ahuja
 Love Story 2050 (2008) as Karan's fad
 God Tussi Great Ho (2008) as TV station owner, Kewalchandani
 Rock On!! (2008) as Farhaan Akhtar's boss
 Zindagi Tere Naam (2008)
 Sajna Ve Sajna (2008) as Kartar Singh
 Raat Gayi Baat Gayi (2008) as Saxena
 Kisaan (2008)
 Hello (2008) as Subhash Bakshi
 I Can't Think Straight (2008) as Omar
 Dil Bole Hadippa (2009) as Liyaqat Ali Khan (Lucky)
 Aazan (2011)
 Ra.One (2011)
 Loot (2011) as Batliwala
 London, Paris, New York (2012) as Lalitha's father
 Bhaag Milkha Bhaag (2013) as Jawahar Lal Nehru
 War Chhod Na Yaar (2013) as Politician
 Entertainment (2014) as Pannalal Johri
 Anjaan (2014) as JK
 Samvidhaan (2014) TV serial on RS TV as Pandit Nehru
 Phir Se... (2015)
 Welcome 2 Karachi (2015) as Kedar's father
 Jaanisaar (2015) as Kunwar Iqbal Hassan
 Salaam Mumbai (2016)
 Guardians of the Galaxy Vol. 2 (2017) as Ego (Hindi version)
 Razia Sultan as Marush
 Mission Mangal (2019) as Rupert Desai
 Darbar (2020) as Union Home secretary
Toolsidas Junior(2022) as Jimmy Tandon
HIT: The First Case (2022) as Ajit Singh Shekhawat

Web series
 Parchhayee (2019) as Dadaji
 The Family Man (2019) web series on Amazon Prime as Kulkarni
 Hostages (2019) web series on Hotstar as CM Khushwant Lal Handa
 Guilty (2020)
 A New Day Will Be
 Made in Heaven (2019) web series on Amazon Prime as Kishore Khanna

Television

References

External links

 
 
 BBC – EastEnders – Redirect

1952 births
Living people
Sindhi people
Indian Hindus
Indian people of Sindhi descent
Indian male film actors
People from Agra
Indian male television actors
Indian male stage actors
Indian male voice actors
Male actors in Hindi cinema
Indian emigrants to the United Kingdom
Aligarh Muslim University alumni
Sherwood College alumni